The Fox Chase is an Oswald the Lucky Rabbit short released on June 25, 1928.

Synopsis 
A comic running-of-the-fox with Oswald atop a reluctant horse against a smarter-than-usual fox.

Story 
Oswald was in a fox chase competition, with other participants and several dogs. The fox teases the dogs and the competition owner blows a horn  for everyone to be prepared, the owner of the competition throws a gun as a way of saying that the competition has started. Everyone runs forward and Oswald and Horace are left behind while Horace is jumping in the same corner and throws Oswald up and makes him go down on your tail like a playground slide  instead of running. 

Horace was being stubborn and he didn't want to move on just to make fun of Oswald while the poor rabbit just got hurt. Oswald even so tries 2 times to mount the horse jumping on he's back but Horace prevented and he get up higher. Oswald also tried putting a ladder behind Horace, but it still didn't work. But now Oswald tried to tie a ladder to Horace's tail, Horace finally runs, but it's just to keep making fun of Oswald and not let him upstairs.

One of the dogs tries to bite the fox, but the fox slaps him with his own tail. The fox jumps over the wall and a furry dog tries to chase it and ends up hitting the wall and falls on its belly up, other dogs jump on your belly to jump high to pass the wall, to the last one made so much strength on the belly of the furry one that the furry one flies up a little and falls and gets back on his feet and jumps the wall. A sausage dog also jumps and a very tiny puppy appears, who can't jump but tries to grab the wall.

Oswald continues to hold on to the ladder tied to Horace's tail as Horace continues to run, until the ladder unties Horace's tail and Oswald and the ladder are hitting and draging on the ground, the ladder rises and Oswald tells Horace to get close to him to he can mount on him, Oswald manages to get one of his legs onto Horace, but the ladder and Horace move more further apart and Oswald's leg grows so long that he falls to the ground and is dragging himself with pain, Oswald screams loudly for Horace to stop for Oswald to mount him and the scream comes to life and pushes Horace for him to see that Oswald is in a moment of disaster, Oswald uses one (I don't know the name of the object, if you know, edit the History and put the name of the object here) to recharge your legs, Oswald gets up and jumps over to Horace and Oswald makes a push when he leans against Horace's back what his legs are spread out like a spider.

The cunning fox pushes the puddle in the direction the dogs are going to jump in and he laughs even before the dogs jump in as he already knew what was going to happen, when the dogs jump over the wall, they fall into the puddle, and they all come out of there soaking wet, until the furry dog jumps the wall and falls into the puddle and he climbs out, his skin shrinks and it stops on your belly. Some dogs are after the fox and the wiener dog passes/runs over them. The wise fox makes the wiener dog tie its self and she ties a knot on your body, she laughs at the dog and walks away still laughing, and the wiener dog unties himself and goes after the fox leaving there angry. 

Oswald it's finally mounted on Horace in the right way, until the two see the fox running towards them, the fox goes straight and the two run after it, until Horace has his body upside down, minus his legs, Oswald put the parts of Horace that were upside down to the correct side and they continue in search of the fox, Until they trip over a huge rock and change places, the wiener dog passes/runs over them and Oswald holds his tail and Oswald manages to get on the dog and Oswald is so happy that he is celebrating and jumping on the dog that his body ducks, Oswald manages to straighten the dog's body by putting its legs forward instead of lifting it, the back of the dog's body also falls, and Oswald catches it and bends the dog's tail to stay upright and not fall.

A dog and the furry dog spot the fox running towards them and hide in a tree with a hole to enter it and another small hole, when the fox passes under the tree, the two dogs go through the small path and take the fox and they start hitting her, but she curls up and leaves the middle of the fight, when the cloud left, the dog was squeezing the furry dog, taking all his tongue out of his stomach, but the dog only realized when the fox was having a laugh, and scared, he put all the tongue that came out of the furry stomach back into him and the two ran after the fox.

The two dogs knew that the fox was hiding on the log, but the fox started hitting the dogs with a club. Oswald was still on top of the wiener dog, but once Oswald finds the fox hiding on the log hitting the dogs with the club, Oswald jumps from the dog he was with and tries to see the fox hiding on the log, and he is also spanked, He gets an idea to have the dogs go further back while Oswald rolls up the log to get the fox out. Instead of finding the fox, the dogs and Oswald run away in fear after finding a skunk. It was actually the fox in a skunk costume, nobody won the competition and she starts laughing and the episode ends.

References

1928 films
1928 animated films
American silent short films
1920s Disney animated short films
Films directed by Walt Disney
Universal Pictures animated short films
Oswald the Lucky Rabbit cartoons
Animated films about foxes
Animated films about dogs
American black-and-white films
Films about hunters
1920s American films
Silent American comedy films